The Swedish Election Authority is a government agency responsible for organizing national elections and referendums in Sweden. The agency began its operations on 1 July 2001 when it took over the responsibilities from the Swedish National Tax Board.

Local and regional elections are the responsibility of the respective municipalities and county councils, however these elections always take place concurrently with the national elections for the Riksdag. As the central administrative authority for elections, the Swedish Election Authority has an instrumental role in all public elections in Sweden. The authority is also responsible for elections to Sámi Parliament of Sweden.

See also 
Elections in Sweden
Referendums in Sweden

References

Election Authority
Elections in Sweden
Sweden
2001 establishments in Sweden